The 2005–06 season in the Uruguayan Primera División saw Nacional defend and win a back-to-back-title by defeating the surprise of the championship, Rocha F.C., on two consecutive finals, thus winning their 41st title in Uruguayan football. Two teams were relegated, Deportivo Colonia and Cerro, but this time only one team, Progreso, was promoted.

Overview
It was contested by 20 teams, and Nacional won the championship.

Apertura

Relegation table (2005 and Apertura)

Clausura

Championship play-off

Semi-finals

Finals

Nacional winners of semifinal; the team should play the final against the best team of the aggregate table 2005–06; as that is also Nacional, they are champions of Uruguay 2005–06.

Relegation table (2005 and 2005–06)

Topscorers

Notes

References
RSSSF

Uruguayan Primera División seasons
1
Uru
Uru